Utyagulovo (Ütäğol) is a rural locality (a village) and the administrative centre of Utyagulovsky Selsoviet, Zianchurinsky District, Bashkortostan, Russia. The population was 478 as of 2010. There are 5 streets.

Geography 
Utyagulovo is located 74 km southeast of Isyangulovo (the district's administrative centre) by road. Yunayevo is the nearest rural locality.

References 

Rural localities in Zianchurinsky District